Busses Roar is a 1942 film directed by D. Ross Lederman and starring Richard Travis and Julie Bishop.

Plot 
A bungling saboteur attempts to place a bomb on board a bus so that it will explode as the bus passes by some oil wells.  The plot is foiled, but not by the authorities.

Cast

Richard Travis as Sergeant Ryan
Julie Bishop as Reba Richards
Charles Drake as Eddie Sloan
Eleanor Parker as Norma
Elisabeth Fraser as Betty
Richard Fraser as Dick Remick
Peter Whitney as Frederick Hoff
Frank Wilcox as Detective Quinn
Willie Best as Sunshine
Rex Williams as Jerry Silva
Harry Lewis as Danny
Bill Kennedy as The Moocher
George Meeker as Nick Stoddard
Vera Lewis as Mrs. Dipper
Harry C. Bradley as Henry Dipper
Lottie Williams as First Old Maid
Leah Baird as Second Old Maid
Chester Gan as Yamanito

References

External links 

 
 

1942 films
1942 crime films
American crime films
Films directed by D. Ross Lederman
1940s English-language films
American black-and-white films
Warner Bros. films
1940s American films